James Lloyd Johnson (born August 28, 1947) is an American professional baseball coach, and a former infielder and manager at the minor league level. Johnson was primarily a shortstop and third baseman during his playing days. He threw and batted right-handed, stood 6 feet (1.83 m) tall and weighed 170 pounds (77 kg). As a player, Johnson compiled a .252 batting average in 577 minor league games.

Johnson is currently the manager of the Grand Junction Rockies

Early life
Johnson was born at Colona, Illinois. He graduated from Rincon High School in Tucson, Arizona, and attended the University of New Mexico.

Career
He signed his first pro contract with the Houston Astros and spent a quarter-century in their system as an infielder (1969–76), minor league manager (1977–82; 1984–85) (including the Columbus Astros (1978-1979, 1984) and Tucson Toros (1980–82, 1985)) and coordinator of instruction (1983; 1986–93). He then joined the New York Yankees as an instructor and manager, and later worked with the Los Angeles Dodgers and Colorado Rockies as a minor league hitting coordinator. He has also managed additional minor league teams, including the Norwich Navigators in 1995, Greensboro Bats in 1996 and the St. Paul Saints in 2002. He also coached for the China national baseball team at the 2017 World Baseball Classic. Johnson served as the manager of the Grand Junction Rockies of the Pioneer League for the 2021 season.

References

External links

1947 births
Living people
People from Colona, Illinois
Williamsport Astros players
Raleigh-Durham Triangles players
Columbus Astros players
Denver Bears players
Memphis Blues players
New Mexico Lobos baseball players
Baseball infielders
San Antonio Missions managers
Minor league baseball coaches